Osbourn is a settlement in Antigua and Barbuda, home to V.C. Bird International Airport.

Economy 

Osbourn contains the largest airport in Antigua and Barbuda, V. C. Bird International Airport. 

The head office of LIAT is located in Osbourn.

Government 
The Ministry of Information is headquartered in Osbourn.

Geography 
Nearby villages and settlements include Piggotts, New Winthorpes and Potters in Saint George, and Cedar Grove, Parham and Cassada Gardens elsewhere. The settlement is the northern area of Saint George Parish.

Transportation 

V. C. Bird International Airport is located in Osbourn. An Avis car rental building is located 0.62 mi away from V.C. Bird International Airport

Demographics

Census Data (2011)

Education 
Notable schools in Osbourn include
 Antigua Gymnastics Association & Club, located 0.57 mi from the city center.
 Antigua and Barbuda Institute of Technology, located 0.78 mi from the city center.

Climate 
The climate of this city is a Tropical savanna climate (Koppen: Aw)

References 

Saint George Parish, Antigua and Barbuda
Populated places in Antigua and Barbuda